Portage Township is a civil township of Mackinac County in the U.S. state of Michigan.  As of the 2010 census, the township population was 981.

Communities

Geography

Major highways

Demographics
As of the census of 2000, there were 1,055 people, 462 households, and 312 families residing in the township.  The population density was 19.0 per square mile (7.3/km).  There were 1,060 housing units at an average density of 19.1 per square mile (7.4/km).  The racial makeup of the township was 94.31% White, 0.28% African American, 3.41% Native American, 0.09% Asian, 0.19% from other races, and 1.71% from two or more races. Hispanic or Latino of any race were 1.04% of the population.

There were 462 households, out of which 18.0% had children under the age of 18 living with them, 60.4% were married couples living together, 4.8% had a female householder with no husband present, and 32.3% were non-families. 28.1% of all households were made up of individuals, and 13.4% had someone living alone who was 65 years of age or older.  The average household size was 2.16 and the average family size was 2.61.

In the township the population was spread out, with 16.9% under the age of 18, 5.3% from 18 to 24, 19.8% from 25 to 44, 35.8% from 45 to 64, and 22.2% who were 65 years of age or older.  The median age was 50 years. For every 100 females, there were 99.8 males.  For every 100 females age 18 and over, there were 98.0 males.

The median income for a household in the township was $27,037, and the median income for a family was $31,103. Males had a median income of $27,500 versus $30,000 for females. The per capita income for the township was $15,435.  About 11.5% of families and 16.3% of the population were below the poverty line, including 34.4% of those under age 18 and 8.5% of those age 65 or over.

Images

References

Townships in Mackinac County, Michigan
Townships in Michigan